Rookies on Parade is a 1941 Republic Pictures musical–comedy film that was the studios entry into the pre-World War II Army comedy genre.  The Army technical advisor was Captain Jack Voglin who performed the same duty on the 1941 films You're in the Army Now, You'll Never Get Rich, and Buck Privates. The film was directed by Joseph Santley. Bob Crosby, Ruth Terry, Eddie Foy Jr., and Marie Wilson star.

Cast
Bob Crosby as Duke Wilson 
Ruth Terry as Lois Rogers 
Gertrude Niesen as Marilyn Fenton 
Eddie Foy Jr. as Cliff Dugan 
Marie Wilson as Kitty Mulloy 
Cliff Nazarro as Joe Martin 
William Demarest as Mike Brady 
Sidney Blackmer as Augustus Moody 
Horace McMahon as Tiger Brannigan 
William Wright as Bob Madison 
Jimmy Alexander as Tommy

Production 
Marie Wilson met Allan Nixon when she was starring and he played a supporting role in the film. Though she was considered engaged to Nick Grinde, Wilson and Nixon eloped and later divorced.

Soundtrack
I Love You More 
Lyrics by Sammy Cahn 
Music by Saul Chaplin

What More Do You Want 
Lyrics by Sammy Cahn
Music by Saul Chaplin

My Kinda Music
Lyrics by Sammy Cahn
Music by Saul Chaplin

You'll Never Get Rich
Lyrics by Sammy Cahn
Music by Saul Chaplin
Performed by Eddie Foy Jr.

Mother Never Told Me
Lyrics by Sammy Cahn 
Music by Saul Chaplin
Sung by Ruth Terry

Rookies on Parade
Music by Jule Styne
Lyrics by Eddie Cherkose

Chula Chi Hua Hua
Written by Jule Styne, Sidney Clare and Nick Castle

Londonderry Air
Traditional
Music Arranged by Jule Styne
New Lyrics by Sidney D. Mitchell

Release
Rookies on Parade was released in theatres April 17, 1941.

References

Sources

External links
 

1941 films
1941 musical comedy films
American black-and-white films
1940s English-language films
Military humor in film
Republic Pictures films
American World War II films
Films directed by Joseph Santley
American musical comedy films
1940s American films